The white-capped munia (Lonchura ferruginosa) is a species of estrildid finch found in Java and Bali. It is found in marshes, swamps, fens, grasslands habitat. The status of the species is evaluated as Least Concern.

References

BirdLife Species Factsheet

white-capped munia
Birds of Bali
Birds of Java
white-capped munia
Taxa named by Anders Sparrman